"My One Temptation" is the debut single by British singer Mica Paris, from her debut album So Good. "My One Temptation" is an r&b song which has been described as "haunting" by critics.

"My One Temptation" was released by 4th & Broadway and Island Records in 1988 and became Mica Paris' biggest hit, reaching the top ten of the UK Singles Chart and US Adult Contemporary chart. It was also a top twenty hit on the US R&B singles and Irish singles charts.

Charts

Weekly charts

Year-end charts

See also
 List of UK top 10 singles in 1988

References

Mica Paris songs
1988 debut singles
Island Records singles
1988 songs
4th & B'way Records singles
Songs written by Mick Leeson
Songs written by Peter Vale
1980s ballads
Contemporary R&B ballads
Soul ballads